LaFayette Square is a historic semi-gated neighborhood in the central region of Los Angeles, California.

Although founded in 1913 by real estate developer George Lafayette Crenshaw, it is named after the French Marquis de Lafayette, who fought alongside Colonists in the American Revolution. Lying west of Crenshaw Boulevard in the Mid-City area, it was designated by the city as a Los Angeles Historic Preservation Overlay Zone in 2000 for its significant residential architecture and history.

History

Early sales
Properties in the tract,  which was described as "part of the Nadeau Rancho vineyard," between "Washington and Sixteenth streets . . . immediately west of Crenshaw Boulevard" went on sale in 1913.

According to the Los Angeles Conservancy, "LaFayette Square was the last and greatest of banker George L. Crenshaw's ten residential developments in the City of Los Angeles."  The tract is composed of four north-south  streets with an east-west grassy divider.

Unsold lots were liquidated in early 1920.

Viaduct

A petition to the city by Lafayette Square residents in September 1915 urged construction of a level crossing to bring West Boulevard across the Pacific Electric tracks. Without it, the petitioners said, ""children have to walk two miles to school" and stores refused to make deliveries because of the distance around the blockage. Instead, the city's Public Utilities Board approved plans for a more expensive viaduct over the tracks, saying a level crossing would be the worst "death-trap" in the city were it built.

After visiting the site, the City Council approved a $40,000 viaduct for which Pacific Electric would pay half the cost and the city and land owners would pay the rest. Property owners agreed. Construction on the viaduct took place in 1920.

Gates

Around 1980, the Lafayette Square Association proposed closing entrances to the neighborhood by blocking the ends of the streets to create cul-de-sacs. Neighbors debated issues of crime, traffic speed and emergency vehicle access. In 1989, the Los Angeles City Council unanimously approved the plans.

In the early 1990s, wrought-iron gates were installed at the ends of Buckingham Road, Virginia Road, Wellington Road and Victoria Avenue.  The only way into the neighborhood by car is at St. Charles Place.  To pay for the enclosures, the homeowners were assessed $40 per year for 10 years.

Geography

LaFayette Square is situated about 7 miles (11 km) west of Downtown Los Angeles.  It is south of Victoria Park, east of Arlington Heights and north of Wellington Square.

It consists of eight blocks, centered on St. Charles Place, and situated between Venice Boulevard on the north, Washington Boulevard on the south, Crenshaw Boulevard on the east and West Boulevard on the west.  There are 236 homes in the neighborhood.

Residences

Crenshaw wanted this development to have a European flair so it was designed as an elegant residential park centered on St. Charles Place—a broad palm tree-lined avenue with a landscaped median. The houses in Lafayette Square reflect residential styles popular during the 1910s and 1920s such as Tudor Revival architecture, Italianate, Mediterranean Revival, Neo-Federalist, American Craftsman, Spanish Colonial Revival, and American Colonial Revival. Several houses, such as architect Paul Williams’ own home, were designed in the Modern style, exemplifying an important trend in Los Angeles’ architectural development.

According to a Los Angeles Times real-estate section article on the neighborhood, "Most of the properties have period details: Juliet balconies, mahogany staircases and libraries, sitting rooms, stained glass windows, triple crown molding, soaring ceilings—even four-car garages."

Demographics

Home ownership shifted "between white-only homeownership during the 1920s through the 1940s to nearly all African American" in the 1950s with court decisions lifting restrictive covenants against black people. The community became more racially mixed "as more white families, priced out of the Westside and Hancock Park" began returning in the early 1990s.

Schools

The neighborhood is zoned to the following schools in the Los Angeles Unified School District:
 Alta Loma Elementary School
 Johnnie L. Cochran Jr. Middle School (formerly Mount Vernon Middle School)
 Los Angeles High School

Notable residents

In chronological order by birth year
 William Claude Dukenfield, W.C. Fields (1880-1946), actor
 George Pepperdine (1886-1962), entrepreneur and philanthropist, founder of Pepperdine University
 Roscoe Conkling Arbuckle, Fatty Arbuckle (1887-1933), actor
 Paul R. Williams (1894-1980), architect
 Norton Simon (1907-1993), art collector
 Joseph Louis Barrow, Joe Louis (1914-1981), boxer
 Vaino Spencer (1920-2016), lawyer and judge
 Paul Younger Tank Younger, (1928-2001), football player
 Richard Wayne Penniman, Little Richard (1932-2020),  musician, singer, and songwriter
 John Roseboro (1933-2002), baseball player and coach
 Larry McCormick (1937-2004), actor, reporter and news anchor
 John Mack (1937-2018), L.A. Urban League president
 Mahdi Abdul-Rahman, Walt Hazzard (1942-2011), basketball player and coach

See also

List of districts and neighborhoods of Los Angeles

References

External links
 Lafayette Square Association

Neighborhoods in Los Angeles
Central Los Angeles
Mid-City, Los Angeles
Wilshire, Los Angeles
1913 establishments in California
Populated places established in 1913